Physodera dejeani is a species of carabid beetle found in Southeast Asia.

References 

Carabidae